Licania platypus, also known as sun sapote, sansapote, sonzapote, sunzapote, sungano, zapote cabelludo, sapote, sangre, zapote amarillo, zapote borracho, zapote cabello, zapote de mico, zapote de mono, mesonsapote, mezonzapote, cabeza de mico, caca de nino, sonza, sunza, zunza, chaute jolobob, urraco, chupa, and monkey apple, is a flowering tree in the family Chrysobalanaceae.

Distribution
It has been introduced to India, the Philippines, Trinidad and Tobago, Florida, and Hawaii.

Description

The tree grows erect, sometimes reaching  in height. It has a thick, rounded crown and is heavily foliaged. The bark is dark purplish to brown in color and is dotted with small white to reddish-white lenticels. The trunk is sometimes buttressed. The leaves are deciduous and alternate, sometimes spiraled, and elliptic to lanceolate in shape. New foliage is bronze or reddish-purple in color and is very showy. The flowers, which are abundant and fragrant and are in broad terminal and branched panicles which measure  in length, are small and hairy and have recurved petals with numerous protruding stamens. Only 1-3 fruits form from each particle. It has a rather thin, sometimes warty rind which is dark brown to reddish in color and dotted with white lenticels. The flesh is orange-yellow to yellow in color, somewhat pumpkin-scented, soft, fibrous, and dry or juicy, and has a mildly sweet flavor somewhat similar to sapodilla. It normally contains 1 seed which is ovate to oblong and flattened in shape and measures  in length. It blooms from July to September and fruits from August to December the following year. Fruiting begins when the tree is about 10 years of age. It is hardy to USDA zone 11 and does not tolerate frost or temperatures below 4.5 C (40 F).

Drought tolerance
Licania platypus is surprisingly drought tolerant compared to that of many other species native to central Panama. Experiments with 15-month-old seedlings showed slight wilting corresponding to leaf water potentials and relative water contents of -2.7 MPa and 0.85, and plants did not die until these values fell to -7.5 MPa and 0.14.

Uses
The tree is planted as an ornamental and shade tree throughout Central America. The fruits, although held in low esteem, are eaten when no better fruits are available and are sometimes sold in local markets. They are eaten by tapirs and peccaries when fallen on the ground. The wood of the tree is fine-grained, heavy, and strong, although not durable in contact with the ground. It is sometimes used in furniture making and cabinetwork, although not often as the tree is seldom felled.

See also
List of Licania species
List of culinary fruits

References

Taxa named by Karl Fritsch
Plants described in 1889
Fruit trees
Flora of Mexico
Flora of Central America
Flora of Colombia
IUCN Red List least concern species
Edible fruits
Ornamental trees
platypus
Taxobox binomials not recognized by IUCN